Vigdis Moe Skarstein  (born 24 December 1946) is a Norwegian librarian. She was born in Levanger.

She was appointed director of the Norwegian University of Science and Technology from 1998 to 2004. She served as director of the National Library of Norway from 2004 to 2014.
From 2001 to 2009 she chaired the Arts Council Norway.

References

 

1946 births
Living people
People from Levanger
Norwegian librarians
Norwegian civil servants
University of Oslo alumni